Žnidaršič is a Slovene surname. Notable people with the surname include:

 Anita Žnidaršic, a Slovenian professional racing cyclist
 Jonas Žnidaršič, a Slovenian television personality and journalist
 Tone Žnidaršič, a Slovene painter and sculptor

Slovene-language surnames